The 1991–92 NHL season was the 75th regular season of the National Hockey League. The league expanded to 22 teams with the addition of the expansion San Jose Sharks. For the first time, the Stanley Cup Finals extended into June, with the Pittsburgh Penguins repeating as Stanley Cup champions, winning the best of seven series four games to none against the Chicago Blackhawks.

League business
This was the first season for the San Jose Sharks, the first expansion team in the NHL since 1979. The birth of the Sharks returned NHL hockey to the San Francisco Bay Area after the California Golden Seals had relocated to Cleveland, Ohio in 1976.

This was also the last season for John Ziegler as NHL president. He would be succeeded by Gil Stein, who held the position for one year before being replaced by newly named commissioner Gary Bettman, during and after the 1992–93 season. After Stein's departure, the league presidency was merged into the new office of commissioner.

A new rule was added in which the final minute of every period is measured in tenths of a second, unlike whole seconds as in past seasons. This timekeeping procedure matches that of the  IIHF, which began doing so in 1990.

75th season celebration
To celebrate the 75th anniversary season for the NHL, all players wore a special anniversary patch on their uniforms during this season.

Taking cues from Major League Baseball's "Turn Back The Clock" uniform program, throwback uniforms were worn by Original Six teams for select games, and throwbacks were also worn for the All-Star Game.

The uniform styles that were worn include:
 Boston Bruins – c. 1933
 Chicago Blackhawks – c. 1940
 Detroit Red Wings – c. 1928
 Montreal Canadiens – c. 1926
 New York Rangers – c. 1940
 Toronto Maple Leafs – c. 1940
 Wales All-Stars – white All-Star jersey c. 1952
 Campbell All-Stars – red All-Star jersey c. 1952

The throwback uniforms would influence future seasons in the NHL, as several teams adopted throwbacks as alternate jerseys.  The National Football League and National Basketball Association would follow the NHL's lead, with teams wearing throwbacks to celebrate their leagues' 75th and 50th anniversaries, respectively.

Also, each team had an honorary celebrity captain to help celebrate the 75th anniversary.

The celebrity captains were:

 Jim Kelly - Buffalo Sabres
 Michael J. Fox - Boston Bruins
 Ian Tyson - Calgary Flames
 Jim Belushi - Chicago Blackhawks
 Dave Coulier - Detroit Red Wings
 Kurt Browning - Edmonton Oilers
 Susan Saint James - Hartford Whalers
 John Candy - Los Angeles Kings
 David Wheaton - Minnesota North Stars
 Maurice Richard - Montreal Canadiens
 Yogi Berra - New Jersey Devils
 Ralph Macchio - New York Islanders
 Marv Albert - New York Rangers
 Bobby Rydell - Philadelphia Flyers
 Fred Rogers - Pittsburgh Penguins
 Gaétan Boucher - Quebec Nordiques
 Willie McCovey - San Jose Sharks
 John Goodman - St. Louis Blues
 Gordon Lightfoot - Toronto Maple Leafs
 Rick Hansen - Vancouver Canucks
 Larry King - Washington Capitals
 Burton Cummings - Winnipeg Jets

Regular season
He finished the season with 102 points and captured the James Norris Memorial Trophy as the league's best defenceman.

For the first time, the NHL finished play in the month of June. A primary reason for this was the 10-day NHL strike, the first work stoppage in league history, that started on April 1. The games that were supposed to be played during the strike were not canceled, but rescheduled and made up when play resumed on April 12.

For the first time in his NHL career, Wayne Gretzky failed to finish in the top two in scoring.

Final standings
Note: W = Wins, L = Losses, T = Ties, Pts = Points, GF= Goals For, GA = Goals against

Wales Conference

Campbell Conference

Playoffs

Playoff bracket

Stanley Cup Finals

The series was held between the defending Stanley Cup champion Pittsburgh Penguins and the Clarence Campbell Conference champion Chicago Blackhawks. The Penguins won in four games, three out of four won by a one-goal margin. Mario Lemieux of Pittsburgh won the Conn Smythe Trophy as the playoffs' MVP.

Awards

All-Star teams

Player statistics

Scoring leaders
Note: GP = Games played; G = Goals; A = Assists; Pts = Points

Leading goaltenders

Note: GP = Games played; TOI = Time on ice (minutes); W = Wins; L = Losses; T = Ties; GA = Goals against; SO = Shutouts; Sv% = Save percentage; GAA = Goals against average

Coaches

Patrick Division
New Jersey Devils: Tom McVie and Herb Brooks
New York Islanders: Al Arbour
New York Rangers: Roger Neilson
Philadelphia Flyers: Paul Holmgren and Bill Dineen
Pittsburgh Penguins: Scotty Bowman
Washington Capitals: Terry Murray

Adams Division
Boston Bruins: Rick Bowness
Buffalo Sabres: John Muckler
Hartford Whalers: Jim Roberts
Montreal Canadiens: Pat Burns
Quebec Nordiques: Pierre Page

Norris Division
Chicago Blackhawks: Mike Keenan
Detroit Red Wings: Bryan Murray
Minnesota North Stars: Bob Gainey
St. Louis Blues: Brian Sutter
Toronto Maple Leafs: Tom Watt

Smythe Division
Calgary Flames: Doug Risebrough and Guy Charron
Edmonton Oilers: Ted Green
Los Angeles Kings: Tom Webster
San Jose Sharks: George Kingston
Vancouver Canucks: Pat Quinn
Winnipeg Jets: John Paddock

Milestones

Debuts
The following is a list of players of note who played their first NHL game in 1991–92 (listed with their first team):
Stu Barnes, Winnipeg Jets
Martin Brodeur, New Jersey Devils
Pavel Bure, Vancouver Canucks
Keith Carney, Buffalo Sabres
Evgeny Davydov, Winnipeg Jets
Ted Donato, Boston Bruins 
Pat Falloon, San Jose Sharks
Adam Foote, Quebec Nordiques
Bill Guerin, New Jersey Devils
Derian Hatcher, Minnesota North Stars
Bret Hedican, St. Louis Blues
Arturs Irbe, San Jose Sharks
Trevor Kidd, Calgary Flames
Igor Kravchuk, Chicago Blackhawks
Ray Whitney, San Jose Sharks
Joe Juneau, Boston Bruins
Valeri Kamensky, Quebec Nordiques 
Vladimir Konstantinov, Detroit Red Wings
Vyacheslav Kozlov, Detroit Red Wings
Martin Lapointe, Detroit Red Wings
Nicklas Lidstrom, Detroit Red Wings
Shawn McEachern, Pittsburgh Penguins
Marty McInnis, New York Islanders 
Glen Murray, Boston Bruins
Scott Niedermayer, New Jersey Devils
Felix Potvin, Toronto Maple Leafs
Jozef Stumpel, Boston Bruins 
Darryl Sydor, Los Angeles Kings
Keith Tkachuk, Winnipeg Jets
Rob Zamuner, New York Rangers

Last games
The following is a list of players of note that played their last game in the NHL in 1991–92 (listed with their last team):

Barry Pederson, Boston Bruins
Rick Vaive, Buffalo Sabres
Tony Tanti, Buffalo Sabres
Clint Malarchuk, Buffalo Sabres
Greg Millen, Detroit Red Wings
Ilkka Sinisalo, Los Angeles Kings
Larry Robinson, Los Angeles Kings
Chris Nilan, Montreal Canadiens
Patrik Sundstrom, New Jersey Devils
Rick Green, New York Islanders
John Tonelli, Quebec Nordiques
Mark Pavelich, San Jose Sharks
Ken Linseman, Toronto Maple Leafs
Mike Bullard, Toronto Maple Leafs
Randy Gregg, Vancouver Canucks
Mike Liut, Washington Capitals
Mario Marois, Winnipeg Jets
Lucien DeBlois, Winnipeg Jets
Aaron Broten, Winnipeg Jets

See also
List of Stanley Cup champions
1991 NHL Entry Draft
1991 NHL Dispersal and Expansion Drafts
43rd National Hockey League All-Star Game
National Hockey League All-Star Game
NHL All-Rookie Team
Ice hockey at the 1992 Winter Olympics
1991 Canada Cup
1991 in sports
1992 in sports

References
 
 
 
 
Notes

External links
Hockey Database
NHL.com

 
1991–92 in Canadian ice hockey by league
1991–92 in American ice hockey by league